Barry W. Benson (1811/1812 – June 11, 1839) was the Mississippi Secretary of State from 1835 to 1839. He was a Democrat.

Biography 
Barry W. Benson was born in Mississippi. His father was a Mississippi pioneer. Barry W. Benson was elected to the office of the Secretary of State of Mississippi in January 1835. He was re-elected to the office in 1837. At the time of his death, he was the incumbent office holder as well as the Democratic candidate for re-election. He died of pulmonary tuberculosis at the age of 27 on June 11, 1839, at the home of his father-in-law in Columbus, Mississippi, and was survived by his mother and his widow. He had recently gone to Cuba to try to improve his lung condition. In early July 1839, Thomas B. Woodward of Yazoo County was appointed by Governor Alexander McNutt to fill in the vacancy caused by Benson's death.

Personal life 
Benson married the eldest daughter of Major Richard Barry. She remarried after Benson's death.

References 

1810s births
1839 deaths
Secretaries of State of Mississippi

Mississippi Democrats